Serie A is an Italian football league.

Serie A may also refer to:

Italy
 Italian Baseball League
 Italian Volleyball League
 Lega Basket Serie A, basketball
 Lega Serie A, the governing body of football
 Serie A (futsal)
 Serie A (ice hockey)
 Serie A (rugby union)
 Serie A (women's football)
 Serie A (women's futsal)
 Serie A (women's ice hockey league)
 Serie A (women's rugby union)
 Serie A1 (water polo)

Brazil
 Campeonato Brasileiro Série A, Brazilian football league
 Campeonato Brasileiro Feminino Série A1, Brazilian women's football league
 Campeonato Brasileiro Feminino Série A2, Brazilian women's football league

Other places
 Ecuadorian Serie A, Ecuadorian football league 
 Serie A de México, a level 3 football league

See also
 Series A round of venture capital financing